Măng Đen (formerly Đắk Long commune) is a township and administrative seat of Kon Plông District in Kon Tum Province in Vietnam.

The town was built in 2003 around the Sedang villages of Dak Ke and Kon Bring and an abandoned American airfield called Plateau G.I.  The settlement received township status in 2019.

Mang Den's specific sights are pine forests and wild Himalayan cherry blossom in the winter. It is dubbed as "the second Da Lat" due to its temperate climate.

References 

District capitals in Vietnam
Populated places in Kon Tum province
Townships in Vietnam